Someswaran Temple is a Hindu temple dedicated to the deity Shiva, located in Kumbakonam, Tamil Nadu, India. Shiva is worshipped as Someswaran, and is represented by the lingam. His consort Parvati is depicted as Somasundari. The presiding deity is revered in the 7th century Tamil Saiva canonical work, the Tevaram, written by Tamil saint poets known as the nayanars and classified as Paadal Petra Sthalam.

The temple complex covers two acres and is located close to the Sarangapani temple. It houses two gateway towers known as gopurams. The temple has numerous shrines, with those of Someswaran, Somasundari and being the most prominent.

The temple has six daily rituals at various times from 6:00 a.m. to 9 p.m., and twelve yearly festivals on its calendar. The Masi Magam festival is celebrated during the day of the Magam (February - March) is the most prominent festival.

The present masonry structure was built during the Nayak during the 16th century. In modern times, the temple is maintained and administered by the Hindu Religious and Charitable Endowments Department of the Government of Tamil Nadu.

Legend

This place has been referred to in thevaram written by Saint Poet (7th Century AD) Thirugnana Sambanthar and Thirunavukkarasar. Legend has it that the nine sacred rivers of India, prayed to Shiva at Banares (Viswanathar) to be absolved of the sins washed away by bathers, and were directed to bathe in the Mahamagam tank and worship Adi Kumbeswarar Temple. As per another legend, the holy pot from Shiva's arrow split into twelve places where Shiva temples were built and the temple is counted as one of them. As per another legend, due to a great deluge, Brahma, the god of creation was worried as to where to start his creation. He prayed to Shiva who gave a boon that he had to collect soil from various places and create a Mayakumb. He prayed the deity with Bilva leaves and decorated with mango leaves. During deluge, the water was diverted south while the pot floated. The place where it landed and broke, became the Someswaran temple. Since Chandra (Soma) worshipped Shiva here, it is called Someswaran temple. It is believed that the Lingam here is self formed or Swayambu Lingam.

Architecture
Someswar Temple is situated in the southern portion of Sri Sarangapani temple. Legend is that the temple shared a larger space during initial construction, but later Sarangapani Temple adjacent to it occupied more space. The temple is one of the prominent Shiva temples in Kumbakonam. The temple is counted as one of the temples built on the banks of River Kaveri. The temple has a five tiered rajagopuram and the inner gopuram is three tiered. All the shrines of the temple are located inside the concentric walls of the temple. The sanctum is axial to the entrance tower facing east. The shrine of Mangalambigai is located in the hall leading to the sanctum and faces south. The shrine of Ambal faces the southern entrance of the temple located on the Thanjavur - Kumbakonam main road. The precinct around the sanctum has images of Vinayaka, Arumuga with Valli, Gajalakshmi and Nataraja. There was a contention between this temple and the Kasi Viswanathar Temple, Kumbakonam on which one is the temple mentioned as Kudanthai Karonam. Dharmapuram Adheenam, a Saiva monastic institution and some historians believed it to be the Kasi Viswanathar temple, while a convention in 1958 decided that it was Kudanthai Karonam. The songs mentioned in the Tevaram relevant to the temple were sculpted in the temple.

Worship and religious practises

The temple priests perform the puja (rituals) during festivals and on a daily basis. The temple rituals are performed six times a day; Kalasanthi at 6:00 a.m., Irandam Kalm at 9:00 a.m., Uchikalam at 12:00 a.m., Sayarakshai at 6:00 p.m,  Irandam Kalm at 7:30 p.m., and Arthajamam at 9:00 p.m.. Each ritual comprises four steps: abhisheka (sacred bath), alangaram (decoration), naivethanam (food offering) and deepa aradanai (waving of lamps) for Someswaran and Somasundari. Masi Maham during the Tamil month of Maasi (February - March), Shivaratri in February- March and Panguni Uthiram during Panguni are the major festivals celebrated in the temple. Twelve Shiva temples are connected with Mahamaham festival which happens once in 12 years in Kumbakonam. They are Kasi Viswanathar temple, Kumbeswarar Temple, Someswarar Temple, Nageswara Temple, Kalahasteeswarar Temple, Gowthameswarar Temple, Kottaiyur Kodeeswarar temple, Amirthakalasanathar Temple, Banapuriswarar Temple, Abimukeswarar Temple, Kumbakonam, Kambatta Visvanathar Temple and Ekambareswarar Temple. The temple is counted as one of the temples built on the banks of River Kaveri.

The Mahasamprokshanam also known as Kumbabishegam of the temple was held on 2 November 2015. A large number of devotees took part in the Mahasamprokshanam.

Gallery

References

External links

Padal Petra Stalam
Shiva temples in Thanjavur district
Hindu temples in Kumbakonam